King George Street may refer to:
 King George Street (Jerusalem)
 King George Street (Tel Aviv)
 King George Street (song)